Denis St Eval Atkinson (9 August 1926 – 9 November 2001) was a West Indian cricketer who played 22 Test matches as an all-rounder, hitting 922 runs and taking 47 wickets. He also played first-class cricket for Barbados and Trinidad.

Atkinson holds the Test record for the highest seventh-wicket partnership – as captain, he made a stand of 347 with Clairmonte Depeiaza against Australia in 1954–55 to put up a total of 510 in the first innings of a drawn match. Atkinson also led West Indies to a series win in New Zealand the following year.

He also holds the record for bowling the highest number of wicketless overs in a Test innings.  He recorded 72 overs, 29 maidens, no wicket for 137 runs for the West Indies against England at Edgbaston, Birmingham, in 1957.

When Gary Sobers was a boy Atkinson encouraged him by asking him to bowl to him at practice. Atkinson, who played for the Wanderers Cricket Club in Barbados, was able to leave work at his insurance office early for extra batting practice, and he used to put a shilling on top of the stumps and tell Sobers he could have it if he knocked it off. Sobers said, "it was through him that I eventually received recognition". His younger brother Eric also played Test cricket. Eric's first test match, against Pakistan at Bridgetown in 1957–58, was Denis's swansong.

Personal life
Atkinson was a fan of fishing and horse racing. He was also married to wife Betty with whom he had five daughters.

References

External links
 

1926 births
2001 deaths
Barbados cricketers
Trinidad and Tobago cricketers
West Indies Test cricketers
Barbadian cricketers
West Indies Test cricket captains
People from Christ Church, Barbados